Maine Medical Center (commonly abbreviated to MMC or contracted to Maine Med) is a 700-licensed-bed teaching hospital in Portland, Maine, United States. Affiliated with Tufts University School of Medicine, it is located in the Western Promenade neighborhood. It has a staff of over 9,500. The facility is one of only three Level I Trauma Centers in Northern New England. Founded in 1874, it is the largest hospital in northern New England with 28,000 inpatient visits, about 500,000 outpatient visits, 88,000 emergency visits, and over 27,000 surgeries performed annually.  MMC is structured as a non-profit, private corporation governed by volunteer trustees. Maine Medical Center is wholly owned by, and serves as the flagship hospital for, MaineHealth, a non-profit healthcare network servicing Maine and New Hampshire.

History

Maine Medical Center is the largest tertiary care hospital in Northern New England, serving all of Maine and parts of Vermont and New Hampshire.  It is a Level One Trauma Center, most recently named by U.S. News & World Report as one of the top hospitals in America for heart care, orthopedics and gynecology, and home to the Barbara Bush Children's Hospital, cited as one of the Top 25 children's hospitals in the country.

Maine Medical Center is a teaching hospital, with an affiliation with the University of Southern Maine, Saint Joseph's College, Tufts University and Dartmouth College.  As a part of its mission, MMC is also a leader in biomedical research, through its Maine Medical Center Research Institute, ongoing clinical trials, and translational research.
 
The present-day complex of more than one million square feet (92,000 square meters) was completed in 1984. In 2009, Maine Medical Center completed a major expansion, to include a new or improved emergency department, birthing center, neonatal intensive care unit, helipad, utility plant, and parking garage. In August 2007, it opened a new Ambulatory Surgical Center in Scarborough, Maine, named Scarborough Surgical Center. Maine Medical Center also has the Brighton Medical Center Campus, which is the location of Brighton First Care and New England Rehab.

In 2010, Maine Medical Center's 18,000-square-foot, $6-million Hannaford Center for Safety, Innovation and Simulation opened at the Brighton campus.

In 2014 Maine Medical Center began construction on a $40-million, 40,000-square-foot surgical expansion on top of the existing Bean building. Opened in 2015, it features 5 operating rooms and 20 perioperative-care beds, and allows for the creation of a cardiac hybrid operating room.

Maine Medical Center Research Institute
Since 1956, Maine Medical Center has recruited NIH-funded scientists to staff its research institute. The facility is subdivided into the centers for molecular medicine, clinical and translational research, outcomes research and evaluation, psychiatric research, and Lyme and vector-borne diseases.  The institute also participates in multiple national and international clinical trials in fields ranging from cardiology to oncology, offering opportunities for graduate and post-doctoral training as well as funding.

Currently, Maine Medical Center Research Institute is one of 126 NIH-designated "Centers for Research Excellence" receiving funding for stem and progenitor cell biology and regenerative medicine.

Governance

Maine Medical Center is owned by MaineHealth, the state's largest healthcare organization. MaineHealth formed in the late 1990s from MMC, with its first board of directors serving from 1999 to 2000. MaineHealth owns and operates a series of mental, long-term, primary care, emergency, and home healthcare facilities in southern, central, and western Maine. Other MaineHealth companies include Memorial Hospital, North Conway NH, Western Maine Health (Penbay Medical Center & Waldo), Southern Maine Health Care (Biddeford & Sanford), LincolnHealth, Spring Harbor Hospital and HomeHealth-VNSM.

Barbara Bush Children's Hospital
Referred to as a "hospital within a hospital", the Barbara Bush Children's Hospital (BBCH) is integrated within Maine Medical Center to offer a complete range of pediatric services, specialties and programs including behavioral and developmental, neonatal, cardiology, infectious disease, neurology, palliative care and otolaryngology, among others. The original Children's Hospital opened in 1908, later merging with the Maine Eye and Ear Infirmary (opened in 1890) and the Maine General Hospital (opened in 1874) to become Maine Medical Center. In 1998, the facility sought formal accreditation for its children's services as the Barbara Bush Children's Hospital at Maine Medical Center. The hospital treats infants, children, teens, and young adults aged 0–21 throughout Maine.

Specialty programs and care centers
Barbara Bush Children's Hospital
Joint Replacement Center
Family Birth Center
Cancer Institute
Digestive Health Center
Poison Center
Scarborough Surgery Center
MaineHealth VitalNetwork
Maine Transplant Program

Affiliations
Maine Medical Center is a teaching hospital, currently using the Maine Track program at Tufts University School of Medicine.  This program allows students from Maine, or those interested in practicing there, to complete the second through fourth year of medical school at MMC in Portland rather than Boston. MMC also hosts a number of third year clerkships for students from the Geisel School of Medicine at Dartmouth and University of New England College of Osteopathic Medicine.

References

External links
Maine Medical Center official website
A photograph of the original building, then named Maine General Hospital

Teaching hospitals in the United States
Hospitals in Portland, Maine
Tufts University
Hospitals established in 1874
West End (Portland, Maine)
1874 establishments in Maine
Trauma centers